This is a list of Norwegian football transfers in the 2021 summer transfer window by club. Only clubs of the 2021 Eliteserien and 2021 1. divisjon are included.

The summer transfer window lasted from 1 August to 31 August. The deadline for signing players on a free transfer was 26 September. In addition, young players up to and including 21 years of age may be loaned until 16 October, and junior players may be promoted to the senior squad at any time.

Eliteserien

Bodø/Glimt

In:

Out:

Brann

In:

Out:

Haugesund

In:

Out:

Kristiansund

In:

Out:

Lillestrøm

In:

Out:

Mjøndalen

In:

Out:

Molde

In:

Out:

Odd

In:

Out:

Rosenborg

In:

Out:

Sandefjord

In:

Out:

Sarpsborg 08

In:

Out:

Stabæk

In:

Out:

Strømsgodset

In:

Out:

Tromsø

In:

Out:

Viking

In:

Out:

Vålerenga

In:

Out:

1. divisjon

Aalesund

In:

Out:

Bryne

In:

Out:

Fredrikstad

In:

Out:

Grorud

In:

Out:

HamKam

In:

Out:

Jerv

In:

Out:

KFUM

In:

Out:

Ranheim

In:

Out:

Raufoss

In:

Out:

Sandnes Ulf

In:

Out:

Sogndal

In:

Out:

Start

In:

Out:

Stjørdals-Blink

In:

Out:

Strømmen

In:

Out:

Ull/Kisa

In:

Out:

Åsane

In:

Out:

References

Further reading
Aalesund Bryne Fredrikstad Grorud HamKam Jerv KFUM Ranheim Raufoss Sandnes Ulf Sogndal Start Stjørdals-Blink Strømmen Ull/Kisa Åsane

Norway
Transfers
2021